Phyllonorycter deschkanus is a moth of the family Gracillariidae. It is known from Spain.

The larvae feed on Genista cinerea. They probably mine the leaves of their host plant.

References

deschkanus
Moths of Europe
Moths described in 2006